Robert Browning School is a French-immersion public elementary school in Winnipeg, Manitoba, Canada.

Generally, students from this school passing to grade 6 attend École Ness (the only middle school in the St. James-Assiniboia School Division that has French immersion available) if wishing to continue with French immersion, otherwise they generally attend Lincoln Middle School which does not have French immersion.

Mission statement

École Robert Browning is a bilingual setting where we respect ourselves and others.  We accept responsibility for our actions and our learning.

L'école Robert Browning est un milieu français où nous respectons nous-mêmes et les autres.  Nous acceptons la responsabilité de nos actions et de notre apprentissage.

Academics

Contrary to popular belief, students in French immersion do not lack in skills with English Language Arts. 25% of the school day is English and at the grade 5 level, English Language Arts Divisional Test results of Robert Browning's students have consistently been above the Division mean.

Elementary schools in Winnipeg
French-language schools in Manitoba
Educational institutions in Canada with year of establishment missing

St. James, Winnipeg